is a Japanese actor and voice actor from Tochigi Prefecture. He is affiliated with Seinenza Theater Company.   He is an actor, known for The Last: Naruto the Movie (2014), Chōjin Sentai Jetman (1991) and Naruto Shippûden: Ultimate Ninja Storm 3 (2013).

Filmography

Film
 Reijo niku-dorei (1985) - Michitarô Ogisu / Servant of the villa
 Itazura Lolita: Ushirokara virgin (1986) - Nishida
 Newaza Gal: Ushirokara Icchokusen (1987) - Gengorô Yano
 Ori no naka no hoshigaru onnatachi (1987) - Hisaya Shibusawa
 Tetsuo II: Body Hammer (1992) - Big Skinhead
 Gekijouban Naruto: Buraddo purizun (2011) - A, The Fourth Raikage (voice)
 Eiga Kureyon Shinchan: Bakauma! B-kyu gurume sabaibaru!! (2013) - Okonomiyaki's Bunta (voice)
 Gekijôban Shingeki no Kyojin Kôhen: Jiyû no tsubasa (2015) - Dallis Zacklay (voice)

Television dramas
 Chōjin Sentai Jetman (1991, 2 episodes) - Supreme Commander Akira Ichijou
 Kamen Rider Agito (2001) - Doctor
 Aibō (2009) - Inui
 Doubutsu Sentai Zyuohger (2016) - Turtle Man

Television animation
 In the Beginning: The Bible Stories (1997) – Judah
 Saikano (2002) – Staff A
 Stitch! ~The Mischievous Alien's Great Adventure~ (2009) – Captain Khan
 Heroman (2010) – Tom
 Naruto: Shippuden (2010) – Fourth Raikage Ay
 Attack on Titan (2013) – Dhalis Zachary
 Gargantia on the Verdurous Planet (2013) – Fairlock
 Argevollen (2014) – Chief
 The Pilot's Love Song (2014) – Ameriano
 Pokémon Mega Evolution Act II, III, IV (2014) – Fleur-de-lis (Lysandre)
 Terror in Resonance (2014) – Kurahashi
 Chaika - The Coffin Princess (2014) – Arthur Gaz
 Triage X (2015) – Isoroku Tatara
 Pocket Monsters: XY&Z (2016) – Fleur-de-lis (Lysandre)
 Re:Zero − Starting Life in Another World (2016) – Oni Leader
 Yuri!!! on Ice (2016) – Yakov Feltsman
 The Saga of Tanya the Evil (2017) – Being X
 Attack on Titan Season 3 (2018) – Dhalis Zachary
 Boruto: Naruto Next Generations (2018) - Fourth Raikage Ay
 Yashahime: Princess Half-Demon (2020) - Nikosen
 Attack on Titan Season 4 (2021) – Dhalis Zachary
 Shaman King (2021) - Tao Yúan
 Vinland Saga Season 2 (2023) - Ketil

OVA
 Legend of the Galactic Heroes (1994) - Wiesenhof Hutter
 Mobile Suit Gundam Unicorn (2010) - Suberoa Zinnerman
 Iron Man: Rise of Technovore (2013) - Nick Fury

Theatrical animation
 Naruto the Movie: Blood Prison (2011) - Fourth Raikage (A)
 Crayon Shin-chan: Very Tasty! B-class Gourmet Survival!! (2013) - Chichipoi
 The Last: Naruto the Movie (2014) - Fourth Raikage (A)
 Mobile Suit Gundam Narrative (2018) - Suberoa Zinnerman

Video games
 Guilty Gear Xrd -REVELATOR- (2016) - Kum Haehyun 
 Legaia 2: Duel Saga (????) - Straus
 Naruto Shippūden: Gekitō Ninja Taisen! Special (????) - Fourth Raikage (A)
 Naruto Shippuden: Ultimate Ninja Impact (????) - Fourth Raikage (A)
 Naruto Shippuden: Ultimate Ninja Storm Generations (????) - Fourth Raikage (A)
 Naruto Shippuden: Ultimate Ninja Storm 3 (????) - Fourth Raikage (A)
 Naruto Shippuden: Ultimate Ninja Storm Revolution (????) - Fourth Raikage (A)
 Naruto Shippuden: Ultimate Ninja Storm 4 (????) - Fourth Raikage (A)
 CR Mahou Sensei Negima! (2017) - Graf Von Herman
 Final Fantasy VII Remake (2020) - Wymer

Dubbing

Live-action
Samuel L. Jackson
The Negotiator – Lieutenant Danny Roman
Shaft – John Shaft
Unbreakable – Elijah Price
Coach Carter – Ken Ray Carter
Black Snake Moan – Lazarus Redd
Iron Man – Nick Fury
Iron Man 2 – Nick Fury
Captain America: The First Avenger – Nick Fury
Thor – Nick Fury
Fury – Foley
Reasonable Doubt – Clinton Davis
The Legend of Tarzan – George Washington Williams
Kong: Skull Island – Preston Packard
Glass – Elijah Price / Mr. Glass
Shaft – John Shaft
The Last Full Measure – Billy Takoda
The Banker – Joe Morris
Spiral – Marcus Banks
Hitman's Wife's Bodyguard – Darius Kincaid
The Protégé – Moody Dutton
Ving Rhames
Out of Sight – Buddy Bragg
Mission: Impossible III – Luther Stickell
Mission: Impossible – Ghost Protocol – Luther Stickell
Mission: Impossible – Rogue Nation – Luther Stickell
Mission: Impossible – Fallout – Luther Stickell
Keith David
Volcano – Police Lt. Ed Fox
Where the Heart Is – Moses Whitecotton
Transporter 2 – Stappleton
Cloud Atlas – Kupaka / Joe Napier / An-kor Apis / Prescient
15 Minutes (2004 NTV edition) – Det. Leon Jackson (Avery Brooks)
The Affair of the Necklace – Count Cagliostro (Christopher Walken)
Alien 3 – Leonard Dillon (Charles S. Dutton)
American Assassin – Stan Hurley (Michael Keaton)
Armageddon – Charles "Chick" Chappel (Will Patton)
Backtrace – Agent Franks (Christopher McDonald)
Beverly Hills Cop III (1997 TV Asashi edition) – Steve Fulbright (Stephen McHattie)
A Civil Action – Al Love (James Gandolfini)
Cliffhanger (1997 NTV edition) – Delmar (Craig Fairbrass)
Cradle 2 the Grave – "Jump" Chambers (Chi McBride)
Don't Let Go – Bobby Owens (Mykelti Williamson)
Femme Fatale – Black Tie (Eriq Ebouaney)
From the Earth to the Moon – Dave Scott (Brett Cullen)
Game of Thrones – Eddard "Ned" Stark (Sean Bean)
The General's Daughter – Colonel George Fowler (Clarence Williams III)
Heat (1998 TV Asahi edition) – Lieutenant Sammy Casals (Wes Studi)
In Dreams – Detective Jack Kay (Paul Guilfoyle)
Incorporated – Julian (Dennis Haysbert)
The Jacket – Rudy Mackenzie (Daniel Craig)
King Arthur: Legend of the Sword – Sir Bedivere (Djimon Hounsou)
L.A.'s Finest – Joseph Vaughn (Ernie Hudson)
Layer Cake – Morty (George Harris)
Lock, Stock and Two Smoking Barrels – Dog (Frank Harper)
Lovecraft Country – George Freeman (Courtney B. Vance)
Mad Max 2 (2015 Supercharger edition) – The Humungus (Kjell Nilsson)
NYPD Blue – Bobby Simone (Jimmy Smits)
Our Kind of Traitor – Dima (Stellan Skarsgård)
Oz – Leo Glynn (Ernie Hudson)
Planet Terror – Dr. William Block (Josh Brolin)
Platoon (1998 DVD edition) – Sergeant Warren (Tony Todd), Alpha Company Major (Oliver Stone)
Rage – O'Connell (Peter Stormare)
Real Steel – Tak Mashido (Karl Yune)
Smash – Nick Felder (Thorsten Kaye)
Starship Troopers 2: Hero of the Federation – Captain V.J. Dax (Richard Burgi)
Terminator Genisys — Miles Dyson (Courtney B. Vance)
Training Day – Detective Alonzo Harris (Denzel Washington)
Transformers: Age of Extinction – Crosshairs
Wild Things: Foursome – Detective Frank Walker (John Schneider)
The World Is Not Enough – Valentin Zukovsky (Robbie Coltrane)
The Yards – Frank Olchin (James Caan)

Animation
 Avengers Confidential: Black Widow & Punisher – Nick Fury
 Justice League – Despero,  Lobo
 Madagascar – Kowalski
 Madagascar: Escape 2 Africa – Kowalski
 Madagascar 3: Europe's Most Wanted – Kowalski
 Penguins of Madagascar – Kowalski
 Seis Manos – El Balde
 Spider-Man – Sergei Kravenhoff/Kraven the Hunter
 Spider-Man and His Amazing Friends – Kraven the Hunter
 Superman: The Animated Series – Lobo

References

External links
 Official agency profile 
 

1954 births
Living people
Japanese male film actors
Japanese male stage actors
Japanese male television actors
Japanese male video game actors
Japanese male voice actors
Kokugakuin University alumni
Male voice actors from Tochigi Prefecture
20th-century Japanese male actors
21st-century Japanese male actors